A catalogue number (British English) or catalog number (American English) may refer to:

 Any number used to identify an item in a catalog (disambiguation), including:
 Accession number (disambiguation), in libraries and museums 
 Auction catalogue
 Catalog number (music), a number assigned by a record label
 Catalog number (commercial products), a number assigned to an item for sale by a commercial vendor
 Satellite Catalog Number, a 5-digit number assigned by the US to satellites